The 1957 All-Eastern football team consists of American football players chosen by various selectors as the best players at each position among the Eastern colleges and universities during the 1957 NCAA University Division football season. 

Four players were unanimous first-team picks by the Associated Press (AP), United Press (UP), and International News Service (INS): backs Tom Forrestal of Navy and Bob Anderson of Army; tackle Jim McCusker of Pittsburgh; and guard Joe Palermo of Dartmouth. Anderson was also a consensus first-team All-American and was later inducted into the College Football Hall of Fame.

The 1957 Navy Midshipmen football team won the Lambert Trophy and was ranked No. 5 in the final AP Poll. Four Navy players received first-team All-Eastern honors: Forrestal; end Pete Jokanovich; tackle Bob Reifsnyder; and guard Tony Stremic.

Backs 
 Tom Forrestal, Navy (AP-1 [qb], UP-1, INS-1)
 Bob Anderson, Army (AP-1 [hb], UP-1, INS-1)
 Bill Austin, Rutgers AP-1)
 John Sapoch, Princeton (AP-1)
 Pete Dawkins, Army (UP-1)
 Tom Greene, Holy Cross (UP-1)
 Dave Kasperian, Penn State (INS-1)
 Gene Coker, Yale (INS-1)

Ends 
 Les Walters, Penn State (AP-1, UP-1)
 Dick Lasse, Syracuse (UP-1, INS-1)
 Michael Cavallon, Yale (AP-1)
 Pete Jokanovich, Navy (INS-1)

Tackles 
 Jim McCusker, Pittsburgh (AP-1, UP-1, INS-1)
 Bob Reifsnyder, Navy (AP-1, UP-1)
 Pete Williamss, Lehigh (INS-1)

Guards 
 Joe Palermo, Dartmouth (AP-1, UP-1, INS-1)
 Tom Meehan, Boston College (AP-1)
 Tony Stremic, Navy (UP-1)
 Dick Carr, Pittsburgh (INS-1)

Center 
 Jim Kernan, Army (AP-1, INS-1)
 Charlie Brueckman, Pittsburgh (UP-1)

Key
 AP = Associated Press
 UP = United Press
 INS = International News Service

See also
 1957 College Football All-America Team

References

All-Eastern
All-Eastern college football teams